Gabriel Francis Marshall Thomson (born 27 October 1986) is an English former actor, best known for his role as Michael Harper in the British situation comedy series My Family.

Career
Thomson began his acting career at the age of four, performing in plays with a company called the Goliards while his family holidayed in Devon. At the age of five, he gave his first TV performance in an advert for Frosties which he later said he'd "rather forget." In 1995, he appeared in a television version of The Bible: Joseph. He followed this up with a small role in another television mini-series called Painted Lady.

It was in 1999 that Thomson secured his first major acting role, playing Young Pip in a BBC adaption of Great Expectations. It was through his role on Painted Lady that he was cast in Great Expectations, as the casting director of Painted Lady thought he would be perfect as Pip. The same year, Thomson made his big screen debut as Pinocchio in The New Adventures of Pinocchio.

From 2000 until 2011, Thomson played Michael Harper in the British BBC sitcom My Family, starring alongside Robert Lindsay, Zoë Wanamaker, Daniela Denby-Ashe and Kris Marshall. He is the only one out of the Harper children to have appeared in every series as Daniela Denby-Ashe left the series in 2002, later returning in 2004 and Kris Marshall left the series in 2005. He is also remembered for acting alongside Jude Law, Rachel Weisz and Ed Harris in the 2001 film Enemy at the Gates as Soviet spy Sasha Filippov.

He was at one time rumoured to play Harry Potter in the series of films based on the popular books by J.K. Rowling; however, just days later Warner Brothers announced that the part was to be portrayed by Daniel Radcliffe.

Thomson portrayed Lysander in A Midsummer Night’s Dream and Claudio in Much Ado About Nothing with the British Shakespeare Company on their 2009 tour of the UK, the Republic of Ireland, Norway and the Czech Republic.

Also starred in the British film 13Hrs. In 2010, Gabriel joined the cast of GB Theatre Company, playing Orlando in As You Like It and Dr Caius in The Merry Wives of Windsor. The tour included the Republic of Ireland, Norway, the Czech Republic and the UK.

Gabriel also starred in the film, The Lost Choices, released by Metrodome in the UK on 14 September 2015.

On 20 August 2015, Thomson had announced on his Facebook page that he was leaving acting to return to university, and on 15 September the Daily Mirror reported that he was to attend King's College in London for three years to study for a degree in philosophy, with the aim of becoming a human rights lawyer.

Personal life
Thomson attended Elliott School in Putney.

References

External links
 

1986 births
Living people
English male film actors
English male television actors
Male actors from London
Alumni of the Guildhall School of Music and Drama
English male stage actors
20th-century English male actors
21st-century English male actors